The Bill Aker Baseball Complex is a baseball venue located on the campus of Northern Kentucky University in Highland Heights, Kentucky, United States. It is the home field of the Northern Kentucky Norse baseball team, a member of the NCAA Division I Horizon League. The complex is named for Bill Aker, who was the head coach of Northern Kentucky baseball from 1971 to 2000. It has a capacity of 500 spectators.

History
Prior to 2001, the venue was known as Friendship (Ty Amann) Field. In 2001, it was renamed the Bill Aker Baseball Complex at Friendship Field, in honor of former Northern Kentucky head coach Bill Aker. Aker had led the program from its 1971 inception to the end of the 2000 season and had an 807-572-1 overall record.

From 2006 to 2008, the Norse played home games at what was then named Champion Window Field in nearby Florence.

The facility underwent $500,000 renovations in spring 2013, immediately prior to Northern Kentucky's first season in Division I.  The infield grass was replaced with artificial turf. A new outfield fence, foul poles, and drainage system were also added. Prior to the 2017 home opener the outfield, warning track and bullpens were also resurfaced with artificial turf, making the entire playing surface synthetic.

See also
 List of NCAA Division I baseball venues

References

College baseball venues in the United States
Baseball venues in Kentucky
Northern Kentucky Norse baseball